José Antonio Hurtado Gallegos (born 13 June 1955) is a Mexican politician affiliated with the Convergence. He currently serves as Deputy of the LXII Legislature of the Mexican Congress representing the Federal District.

References

1955 births
Living people
People from Mexico City
20th-century Mexican lawyers
Citizens' Movement (Mexico) politicians
21st-century Mexican politicians
Deputies of the LXII Legislature of Mexico
Members of the Chamber of Deputies (Mexico) for Mexico City